Hans van der Pluijm (born 3 January 1949) is a Dutch football coach who most recently coached Azam. in Tanzania. A former goalkeeper, he played for FC Den Bosch between 1967 and 1986. After retiring, he was the manager of Den Bosch until 1995. He then spent a season with SBV Excelsior and since 1999 works in Ghana. His best achievement as a coach/manager was the final of the Dutch Cup in 1991, which Den Bosch lost 1–0.

References

1949 births
Living people
People from Heusden
Footballers from North Brabant
Association football goalkeepers
Dutch footballers
Eredivisie players
Eerste Divisie players
FC Den Bosch players
Dutch football managers
FC Den Bosch managers
Excelsior Rotterdam managers
Young Africans S.C. managers
Ashanti Gold S.C. managers
Dutch expatriate football managers
Dutch expatriate sportspeople in Ghana
Expatriate football managers in Ghana
Dutch expatriate sportspeople in Tanzania
Expatriate football managers in Tanzania